"Body 2 Body" is the third official single from rapper Ace Hood from his third album Blood, Sweat & Tears. The hip hop song features R&B singer Chris Brown and was released July 26, 2011.

Critical reception
David Jeffries praised the track: "Cool pillow-talk tracks like “Body 2 Body” with Chris Brown and the J.U.S.T.I.C.E. League come off as crowd-pleasing interludes in an otherwise hungry album that takes the DJ Khaled style of Florida rap from penthouse to pavement." Hip Hop DX panned the song: ""Body 2 Body"  is almost a reprieve with its smoother sound, but with lines like “Was that Chanel 5? Very sexy fragrance / Are those your real eyes? Can tell you’re partially Asian,” no one will have cause to press rewind."

Music video
A music video to accompany the release of "Body 2 Body" was first released onto YouTube on July 27, 2011 at a total length of four minutes and two seconds. It features cameos from DJ Khaled and Rick Ross. As of April 2021 the video has over 20 million views.

Remix
The official remix features Chris Brown on the chorus, Rick Ross, Wale & DJ Khaled. It was released on November 14, 2011.

Track listing

Chart performance
"Body 2 Body" spent thirteen weeks on the US Billboard Hot 100 in total, during which it reached a highest position of number 65. The song also peaked at number six on both the Hot R&B/Hip-Hop Songs and Rap Songs charts, making it Ace Hood's highest charting entry on both listings.

Charts

Weekly charts

Year-end charts

Release history

References

External links
 https://web.archive.org/web/20110718063851/http://realtalkny.uproxx.com/2011/07/topic/topic/music/ace-hood-ft-chris-brown-body-2-body/
 http://rapfix.mtv.com/2011/08/08/ace-hood-body-to-body/

2011 singles
Ace Hood songs
Chris Brown songs
Songs written by Ace Hood
Songs written by Kevin Cossom
Songs written by Chris Brown
Songs written by Erik Ortiz
Songs written by Kevin Crowe
Song recordings produced by J.U.S.T.I.C.E. League